Andekaleka (also Gare Andekaleka) is a town and commune in Madagascar. It belongs to the district of Vohibinany (district), which is a part of Atsinanana Region.

Geography
The town lies has a railway station on the East Coast line from  Antananarivo – Toamasina.

Economy
 the Andekaleka Dam, a hydraulic power station on the Vohitra river.

Rivers
The town is crossed by the Vohitra river.

See also
 Railway stations in Madagascar

References and notes

Populated places in Atsinanana